Robert Everist Greene (born 1943) is an American mathematician at UCLA.

Greene was an undergraduate at Michigan State University and a Putnam Fellow in 1963. He completed his Ph.D. at the University of California, Berkeley in 1969. His doctoral advisor was Hung-Hsi Wu; his doctoral thesis was titled Isometric Embeddings of Riemannian and Pseudo-Riemannian Manifolds.

Bibliography 
Some of Greene's books and papers are:

 Function theory of One Complex Variable (Graduate Studies in Mathematics 40)
 Differential Geometry
 The Automorphism Groups Of Domains
 Function Theory On Manifolds Which Possess A Pole
 Introduction to Topology (with Theodore Gamelin)
 Several Complex Variables and Complex Geometry

References

External links
 

1943 births
Living people
20th-century American mathematicians
University of California, Berkeley alumni
21st-century American mathematicians
Putnam Fellows